Luče is a village in the Municipality of Grosuplje in central Slovenia. The area is part of the historical region of Lower Carniola. The municipality is now included in the Central Slovenia Statistical Region.

Church

The local church is dedicated to Saint Oswald and belongs to the Parish of Žalna. It is a medieval building that was greatly rebuilt and restyled in the 18th century.

References

External links

Luče on Geopedia

Populated places in the Municipality of Grosuplje